{{Infobox weapon
|name=Beretta 92
|image=
|caption=Beretta 92A1
|origin=Italy
|type=Semi-automatic pistol
|is_ranged=yes
|service=1976–present
|used_by= See Users
|designer=
|design_date= 1975
|manufacturer=Fabbrica d'Armi Pietro Beretta
|production_date=1976–present
|number=3,500,000
|variants=See Variants
|weight=
  (92)
  (92S/SB/F/G)
  (92D)
  (Compact/Vertec)
|length=
 
  (Vertec)
  (Compact/Centurion)
|part_length=
 
  (Vertec/Elites/Border Marshal/Combo)
  (Compact/Centurion)
|range=
|velocity= 
|cartridge=
 9×19mm Parabellum (92 series)
 .40 S&W (96 series)
 9×21mm IMI (98 series)
 7.65mm Luger (98 series)
|feed= Detachable box magazine:
 10, 15, 17, 18, 20, 30, 32 rounds (92, 98 series) 10, 11, 12, 13, 15 rounds (96 series) 10, 13 rounds (Compact L) 8 rounds (Compact Type M)}}

The Beretta 92 (also Beretta 96 and Beretta 98) is a series of semi-automatic pistols designed and manufactured by Beretta of Italy. The Beretta 92 was designed in 1975, and production began in 1976. Many variants in several different calibers continue to be used to the present.

The United States military replaced the .45 ACP M1911A1 pistol in 1985 with the Beretta 92FS, designated as the "M9."

History
The Beretta 92 pistol evolved from earlier Beretta designs, most notably the M1923 and M1951. From the M1923 comes the open slide design, while the alloy frame and the hinged locking block, originally from Walther P38, were first used in the M1951. The grip angle and the front sight integrated with the slide were also common to earlier Beretta pistols. What were perhaps the Model 92's two most important advanced design features had first appeared on its immediate predecessor, the 1974 .380 caliber Model 84. These improvements both involved the magazine, which featured direct feed; that is, there was no feed ramp between the magazine and the chamber (a Beretta innovation in pistols). In addition, the magazine was a "double-stacked" design, a feature originally introduced in 1935 on the Browning Hi-Power.

Carlo Beretta, Giuseppe Mazzetti and Vittorio Valle, all experienced firearms designers, contributed to the final design in 1975.

Evolution

92
Production began in May 1976, and ended in February 1983. Approximately 7,000 units were of the first "step slide" design and 45,000 were of the second "straight slide" type.

92S
In order to meet the requirements of some law enforcement agencies, Beretta modified the Beretta 92 by adding a slide-mounted combined safety and decocking lever, replacing the frame-mounted manual thumb safety. This resulted in the 92S, which was adopted by several Italian law enforcement and military units. The magazine release button is at the bottom of the grip as is customary in Europe. This model was produced from 1978 to 1982.

92SB (92S-1)
The 92SB, initially called 92S-1, was specifically designed for the USAF trials (which it won), the model name officially adopted was the 92SB. Features added include a firing pin block (thus the addition of the "B" to the name), ambidextrous safety levers, 3-dot sights, and relocated the magazine release catch from the bottom of the grip to the lower bottom of the trigger guard. The later relocation of the magazine release button means preceding models (92 & 92S) cannot necessarily use later magazines, unless they have notches in both areas.

A compact version with a shortened barrel and slide and 13-round magazine capacity known as the 92SB Compact was manufactured from 1981 to 1991.

92F (92SB-F)

In 1984 Beretta introduced a version of the model 92SB slightly modified to create the 92SB-F (the "F" added to denote entry of the model in U.S. Government federal testing) by making the following changes:
 Design of all the parts to make them 100% interchangeable to simplify maintenance for large government organizations.
 Squared off the front of the trigger guard. The squared-off trigger guard protects both the gun and the shooter during hand-to-hand combat. Some have suggested that the square guard enables the shooter to grip the front of the trigger guard with the supporting forefinger to enhance aiming; however, firearms trainer and Beretta collaborator Ernest Langdon says that using the forefinger to grip the front of the trigger guard is improper technique.
 Recurved the forward base of the grip to aid aiming.
 Hard chromed the bore to protect it from corrosion and to reduce wear.
 New surface coating on the slide called Bruniton, which allegedly provides better corrosion resistance than the previous plain blued finish.

The French military adopted a modified version of the 92F with a decocking-only lever as the PAMAS G1. These pistols have tellurium in the slide, making the steel brittle and as such only have a service life of approximately 6,000 rounds.

92FS

The 92FS has an enlarged hammer pin that fits into a groove on the underside of the slide. The main purpose is to stop the slide from flying off the frame to the rear if it cracks. This was in response to reported defective slides during U.S. military testing. The 92FS also came as a 92FS Centurion model which featured the shorter barrel and slide of the 92 Compact on a full-size 92FS frame.

Design

The Beretta 92's open slide design ensures smooth feeding and ejection of ammunition and allows easy clearing of obstructions. The hard-chromed barrel bore reduces barrel wear and protects it from corrosion. The falling locking block design provides good accuracy and operability with suppressors due to the in-line travel of the barrel. This is in contrast to the complex travel of Browning designed barrels. The magazine release button is reversible with simple field tools. Reversing the magazine release makes left-handed operation much easier.

Increasingly, it has become popular to reduce handgun weight and cost as well as increase corrosion resistance by using polymers. Starting around the year 2000, Beretta began replacing some parts with polymer and polymer coated metal. Polymer parts include the recoil spring guide rod (which is now also fluted), magazine floor plate, magazine follower and the mainspring cap/lanyard loop. Polymer coated metal parts include the left side safety lever, trigger, and magazine release button.

Magazines
To keep in line with the introduction of laws in some locations restricting magazines that hold more than 10 rounds, Beretta now manufactures magazines that hold fewer than the factory-standard 15 rounds. These magazines have heavier crimping (deeper indentations in the side) to reduce the available space while still keeping the same external dimensions and ensuring that these magazines can be used on existing firearms. Beretta also produces 15-round "Sand Resistant" magazines to resolve issues encountered with contractor-made magazines, and 17-round magazines included with the A1 models. Both magazines function in earlier 92 series and M9 model pistols.

Italian magazine manufacturer Mec-Gar now produces magazines in blue and nickel finishes with an 18-round capacity, which fit flush in the magazine well on the 92 series. These magazines provide users in unrestricted states with a larger capacity magazine.

Variants

The Beretta 92 is available in many configurations and models:

Models
92D  The 92D is a double action only variant of the 92FS with no safety/decocker lever.

Vertec  (2001-2007, 2014-2018)
The Vertec is a variant of the 92-series with a re-contoured, straight backstrap, removable sights, 1-slot accessory rail, flared magwell, and 4.7 inch barrel.

90Two  (2006-2012)
The 90two is a 9mm/.40 variant of the 92-series with a redesigned, thicker slide and frame to accommodate an accessory rail, fully dovetailed front sight and .40 S&W pressures. Other features added include a captive recoil spring, internal recoil buffer, user changeable monogrips and 17-round magazines.

92A1 / 96A1  (2010–present)
The 92A1 and 96A1 were introduced in 2010, based on elements from the 92FS and 90two.

Centennial (2015)
The 92 FS Centennial limited edition (500 units) commemorates adoption by the Italian Military of Beretta's earliest semiautomatic pistol, the Model 1915. This Centennial 92 is notable for its frame-mounted manual safety and single-action-only mechanism. The Beretta medallion in each wood grip panel displays the anniversary dates in Roman numerals, which are also engraved on either side of the steel slide. The pistol is packaged in a custom M2A1 ammunition can bearing the Centennial logo.

M9A1 (2006–present)
The M9A1 was adopted by the USMC in 2006. It adds a 1-slot Picatinny rail, more aggressive front and backstrap checkering and a beveled magazine well for easier reloading of the weapon. M9A1 pistols are sold with physical vapor deposition (PVD) coated magazines developed to better withstand the conditions in the sandy environments in Iraq and Afghanistan.

M9A3 (2015–present)
 The M9A3 (the M9A2 concept never went into production) was released in 2015, as a potential upgrade for the US military, in response to the Modular Handgun System trials. The main updates to the M9A3 were a 3-slot Picatinny rail, thinner vertical grip, removable wrap-around grips that can be swapped between Vertec-style and 'old' M9 style, fully removable tritium night sights and a universal slide, which makes the gun convertible from decocker-safety to decocker-only mode. The tip of the barrel is pre-threaded to facilitate addition of a suppressor. Additionally, the M9A3 comes with 17-round sand-resistant magazines in a beveled shape for easier reloading.

Wilson Combat 92G Brigadier Tactical (2014 to present)
 Made in collaboration with Wilson Combat, these pistols differ from the standard Brigadier in that they have a military standard 1913 picatinny rail, all steel controls (as opposed to the polymer coated steel), decock only feature (G-model), 4.7" target crowned barrel, fluted steel guiderod, thin profile G-10 grips, rounded trigger guard, the lighter hammer spring used in the "D" model, Elite II hammer, and their own unique serial number with a "WC" prefix among other features.

 Elite LTT - Langdon Tactical
 The Elite LTT was introduced by Beretta in 2018, in conjunction with firearms trainer Ernest Langdon. The LTT uses the Vertec slide with front cocking serrations on a modified M9A1 frame, and wears Langdon Tactical G10 grips. The pistol comes equipped with G-Model decocker, dovetailed front sight, steel trigger and guide rod, improved springs, and a 4.7 inch stainless barrel with target crown, just to name a few of the more prominent features.

92X (2019–present)
 The 92x was introduced in 2019 as an update to the 92-series and standardization of the Vertec platform. Similar to the M9A3, it features a 3-slot Picatinny rail, thinner vertical grip, removable wrap-around grips that can be swapped between Vertec-style and 'old' M9 style, fully removable sights (High visibility orange dot) and a universal slide, which makes the gun convertible from decocker-safety to decocker-only mode. Unlike the M9A3, the barrel is not threaded. The 92x series comes in compact, centurion, and full size variants.

92X Performance (2019–present)
 The 92x Performance was introduced in 2019, alongside the 92x as a competition pistol. Similar to the 92x, it features a 3-slot Picatinny rail, thinner vertical grip, removable wrap-around grips that can be swapped between Vertec-style and 'old' M9 style, dovetailed sights. The 92x Performance however includes a red fiber optic front sight, adjustable rear sight, front and rear slide serrations, skeletonized hammer, competition hammer spring, steel spring recoil rod, extended beavertail, front and rear frame checkering, oversized magazine release, and match take down lever. The Vertec frame is made of steel rather than alloy, increasing the weight to 48 ounces. The 92x Performance utilizes a frame mounted safety compared to the slide mounted safety of the standard 92x. The Extreme-S trigger mechanism is utilized in the handgun, reducing trigger reset by 40%. The trigger is adjustable for pre-travel (in single action only models), as well as overtravel (in all models).

93R machine pistol

The Beretta 93R is a significantly redesigned 92 to provide the option of firing in three-round bursts. It also has a longer ported barrel, heavier slide, fitting for a shoulder stock, a folding forward grip, and an extended magazine. Unlike other Berettas in the 90 series it is single-action only, does not have a decocker, and very few are around today.

Copies

The Beretta 92 was designed for sports and law enforcement use and, due to its reliability, was accepted by military users in South America and other countries all over the world.

Brazil
After a large order of original 92s for the Brazilian military had been completed, the factory was sold to Taurus, who continued to make the gun as the PT92. These notably differ from modern 92s by their frame-mounted safety rather than their slide-mounted safety.

Egypt
Egypt had produced the Beretta 92 under license as the Helwan 920 with the magazine release button at the bottom of the magazine.

South Africa
Vektor Z-88 (see also Vektor SP1).

Turkey
Turkish companies MKEK and Girsan manufactured a copy of the Beretta 92F as the Yavuz 16 for the Turkish Armed Forces and General Directorate of Security. There has been speculation that these were being made under contract from Beretta. Some of these pistols were imported into the United States by the company American Tactical Imports as the American Tactical 92 or AT-92. The Yavuz 16 was exported to Canada, Colombia, Georgia, Malaysia and Syria.

Users

See also
Beretta 93R
Taurus PT92
List of Beretta 92 models

References

Further reading

 

External links

 Official Beretta 92 page 
 Beretta USA page
 Diagram of Beretta 92
 Details on the Beretta 92
 Free videos of Beretta 92/96 disassembly
 How To Make The 92FS 9mm Shoot Better, Performance Shooter'', October 1997
 Beretta 92F exploded-view parts diagram from American Rifleman

Beretta firearms
.40 S&W semi-automatic pistols
9mm Parabellum semi-automatic pistols
9×21mm IMI semi-automatic pistols
7.65×21mm Parabellum semi-automatic pistols
92
Police weapons
Weapons and ammunition introduced in 1976